Yakuo-ji or Yakuō-ji (Yakuo Temple) (Japanese: 薬王寺) is a Koyasan Shingon temple in Minami, Kaifu District, Tokushima Prefecture, Japan. Temple # 23 on the Shikoku 88 temple pilgrimage. The main image is of Yakushi Nyorai (Bhaiṣajyaguru: "King of Medicine Master and Lapis Lazuli Light").

History
The temple was constructed during Emperor Shōmu's reign.
In the Bunji (文治) era, the temple was destroyed by fire.
Emperor Go-Daigo (後醍醐天皇) (1288 – 1339) ordered the temple to be rebuilt.
 The main hall was rebuilt in 1908.

Cultural properties
The sculpture of Kōbō-Daishi and the Star Mandala (Navagraha) in the temple were designated tangible cultural property of Minami by the Minami Board of Education on November 27, 2015.

References

Sources
 四国八十八箇所霊場会編 『先達教典』 2006年

External links
 薬王寺
 第23番札所 医王山 無量寿院 薬王寺（四国八十八ヶ所霊場会公式）

Buddhist pilgrimage sites in Japan
Buddhist temples in Tokushima Prefecture
Kōyasan Shingon temples